Kim LaShaunda Coles (born January 11, 1962) is an American actress, comedian and game show host. Coles is known for her roles as a cast member on the first season of In Living Color (1990-1991) and as Synclaire James-Jones on the television sitcom Living Single (1993–1998), which both originally aired on Fox. She was the host of BET's game show Pay It Off in 2009.

Early life
Coles was born in Brooklyn, New York City. Her father was the first Black dean of the Pratt Institute. She attended a private Lutheran school and was quiet and studious until high school, when her sense of humor emerged. She graduated from Brooklyn Technical High School.

Career
Coles has appeared on many television shows, including Frasier ("Dr." Mary Thomas), Six Feet Under, Celebrity Mole, Living Single and The Geena Davis Show. Early in her career, she appeared as one of the hosts of It's Showtime at the Apollo. She was an original cast member on the sketch comedy series In Living Color that appeared on the FOX network. After leaving "In Living Color", she then got the role as Synclaire James on Living Single and won an NAACP Image Award for Outstanding Actress in a Comedy Series. She appeared as the mother of Spirit on UPN's One on One. Coles is a published author; her book is called I'm Free But It Will Cost You, Hyperion Books, 1998.

Coles appeared on Celebrity Mole: Hawaii and was the first contestant to be eliminated.  At the reunion of the show, she was one of two celebrities (the other was Michael Boatman) to correctly guess that Frederique van der Wal was the series' saboteur, Kathy Griffin was the winner, and Erik von Detten was the runner-up. Coles also joined other celebrities for a weight loss journey on the VH-1 reality show, Celebrity Fit Club. After 16 weeks, she lost a total of 24 lbs, and dropping nearly 4 percentage points in body fat, going from 34.7% to 31%. She accomplished this with the help of her team, "Ralphie's Angels". She lost 10.2% of her body weight, dropping down to 196 lbs.

Coles was a regular panelist on the 2000 revival of To Tell the Truth during its second season. She was also featured as a guest host on two episodes of The View. Coles was a co-host of the syndicated daytime television show In The Loop With iVillage alongside The Apprentice winner Bill Rancic and fellow season one contestant Ereka Vetrini. She has recently joined the cast of 10 Items or Less on TBS.

On September 30, 2009, she hosted the game show Pay It Off, lasted for one season on BET, which is similar to Debt. In 2010, she appeared on RuPaul's Drag Race. She appeared in an episode of TV One's series "Life After" in late 2011.

Coles has also performed as a stand-up comedian, with some of her material dealing with her struggle with being overweight at times.

Impressions
 Robin Givens
 Marla Gibbs
 DJ Spinderella
 Downtown Julie Brown

Personal life
Coles has been married twice, first to Aton Edwards from 1985 to 1995, then to Reggie Mckiver, a former SWAT police officer in the Dominican Republic, from 2015 to 2019.

Filmography

Film

Television

References

External links

1962 births
20th-century American actresses
21st-century American actresses
American film actresses
African-American stand-up comedians
American stand-up comedians
American television actresses
African-American game show hosts
African-American television producers
Television producers from New York City
American women television producers
Living people
American women comedians
North Carolina Central University alumni
Participants in American reality television series
Brooklyn Technical High School alumni
American women film producers
Film producers from New York (state)
20th-century American comedians
21st-century American comedians
20th-century African-American women
20th-century African-American people
21st-century African-American women
21st-century African-American people